The orders, decorations and medals of Transnistria is a system of state awards of the Pridnestrovian Moldavian Republic (Transnistria).

Orders

Medals

Jubilee medals

Badges

Honored titles 

 City of Military Glory (Bender and Dubăsari)
 Honored Worker of Public Education of Transnistria
 Honored Teacher of Transnistria
 Honored Worker of Physical Culture and Sports of Transnistria
 Honored Coach of Transnistria
 People's Artist of Transnistria
 People's Artist of Transnistria
 Honored Artist of Transnistria
 Honored Artist of Transnistria
 Honored Artist of Transnistria
 Honored Worker of Culture of Transnistria
 Honored Master of Folk Art of Transnistria
 Honored Art Group of Transnistria
 Honored Doctor of Transnistria
 Honored Health Worker of Transnistria
 Honored Worker of Social Security of Transnistria
 Honored Lawyer of Transnistria
 Honored Economist of Transnistria
 Honored Military Pilot of Transnistria
 Honored Military Navigator of Transnistria
 Honored Military Specialist of Transnistria
 Honorary Officer of the Ministry of State Security of Transnistria
 Honored Employee of the Ministry of Internal Affairs of Transnistria
 Honored Employee of the Ministry of Justice of Transnistria
 Honored Officer of the Diplomatic Service of Transnistria
 Honored Employee of the Customs Authorities of Transnistria
 Honored Inventor of Transnistria
 Honored Innovator of Transnistria
 Honored Worker of Transnistria
 Laureate of the State Prize of Transnistria

Other awards 

 Diploma of the President of Transnistria
 Letter of thanks from the President of Transnistria
 Certificate of honor of the Government of Transnistria
 Gratitude from the Government of Transnistria

References 

Orders, decorations, and medals of country subdivisions